Luochuan County is a county in the south of Yan'an City, located in the north of Shaanxi province, China.

Etymology 
The county is named for the Luo River, which passes through the county.

Administrative divisions
Luochuan County is divided into one subdistrict, seven towns, and one township. The county's sole subdistrict is Fengqi Subdistrict, which is home to the county's administrative offices.

Geography 
The Luo River flows through the county from its north to its southeast.

Climate 

History 
The conference, which took place from August 22 to August 25, 1937 was attended by important figures within the party, such as Mao Zedong, Zhou Enlai, and Zhu De. The conference put forth the ideals of the "Ten Outlines to Resist Japan and Save the Country" proposed by Mao, which outlined how to mobilize and unify the country to fight the Japanese.

Economy 
Luochuan County is known for its apple production. In 2010, there were 3.1 mu of apple orchards per capita, the highest ratio in the country. Inspired by a visit to orchards in Japan, the county began promoting a strategy of increased spacing between trees in 2006, which helped yield higher quality apples.

Transportation
A number of important highways run through the county, such as China National Highway 210, the G65 Baotou-Maoming Expressway, and Shaanxi Provincial Road 304. The Xi'an-Yan'an Railway also passes through the Luochuan County.

See also 

 Northern Shaanxi
 Loess Plateau
 Shaan-Gan-Ning Border Region

References 

County-level divisions of Shaanxi
Yan'an